Tatiana Martinez is a Mexican actress, best known for her role as Úrsula in the Nickelodeon sitcom Skimo.

Martinez was born in Mexico City on October 22, 1991

In addition to four seasons of Skimo, Martinez has participated in "Lucho en Familia", "XY", "Capadocia" three TV movies "Profugas del Destino, "Vuélveme a Querer" and "Bellezas Indomables", three movies: "Como no te voy a querer," "Todos los días son tuyos", "La niña en la Piedra" . She has acted in multiple episodes of the series "Lo que Callamos las Mujeres", "Cada quien su santo", "La vida es una canción", and "Lo que la gente cuenta".

She has studied theater since the age of four.

Filmography

External links
 

Living people
Mexican actresses
Year of birth missing (living people)